Citizens Bank of Northern California, locally known as Citizens Bank, was a community bank headquartered in Nevada City, California. The bank served Nevada and Placer counties with seven full-service branches located in: Nevada City, Grass Valley, Penn Valley, Lake of the Pines, Truckee, and Auburn. It offered consumer loans and other traditional banking products and services, designed to meet the needs of small and middle market businesses and individuals. The bank was a wholly owned subsidiary of Citizens Bancorp and is insured by the Federal Deposit Insurance Corporation.  The bank ceased operations on September 23, 2011 as ordered by the Federal Deposit Insurance Corporation.  Customer accounts were transferred to Tri Counties Bank, Chico, California.

History
Originally named Citizens Bank of Nevada County, the bank opened for business on February 8, 1995. In June 2003, it became a wholly owned subsidiary of Citizens Bancorp. In preparation of opening its first branch outside of Nevada County, the bank changed its name to Citizens Bank of Northern California in April 2006.

References

External links
 Official Website
 Federal Deposit Insurance Corporation

Banks based in California
Banks established in 1995
Defunct banks of the United States